Szürketaxi Futball Club was a Hungarian football club from the town of Budapest.

History
Szürketaxi Futball Club debuted in the 1937–38 season of the Hungarian League and finished ninth.

Name Changes 
1932–1937: Szürketaxi FC
1937–1940: Taxisok
1940–1946: did not operate
1946–1947: Szürketaxi FC
1947: merger with MOGÜRT SC 
1948: exit from MOGÜRT SC

References

External links
 Profile

Football clubs in Hungary
1932 establishments in Hungary